Teresita "Tess" Leonardo-De Castro (born Teresita Jose Leonardo; October 10, 1948) is a Filipina who served as the 24th Chief Justice of the Supreme Court of the Philippines; appointed by President Rodrigo Duterte on August 28, 2018. She assumed the vacated position since her predecessor, Maria Lourdes Sereno, was removed via a quo warranto petition (by declaring Sereno a de facto chief justice and making her 2012 appointment null and void ab initio; De Castro was one of the justices who conspired to vote her rival out of office); making De Castro the de jure 24th chief justice, making her the first female chief justice of the Supreme Court.

De Castro officially retired on October 10, 2018, after reaching the mandatory retirement age of 70; merely 46 days after serving as Chief Justice, surpassing the record of former Chief Justice Pedro Yap of being the shortest-tenured Chief Justice.

Prior to her appointment to the High Court by President Gloria Macapagal Arroyo, she had been the Presiding Justice of the Sandiganbayan.

Profile
De Castro's parents are Fortunato R. Leonardo and Maxima Jose of Parañaque. Justice De Castro resides at Merville Subdivision, Parañaque. She is married to businessman Eduardo A. De Castro and they have three children: Maria Cherell, Christine Genevive, and Edouard Anthony. Her half-brother, Eduardo L. Leonardo works as Executive Assistant VI in Sandiganbayan.

De Castro finished her grade school (1960) and high school education (valedictorian, 1964) at St. Paul College of Parañaque, and earned her political science degree (cum laude, 1968) and Bachelor of Laws (1972) at the University of the Philippines. She passed the Philippine Bar Examination of November, 1972 with bar rating of 80.9%.

She started her judicial career as a law clerk, legal and judicial assistant in the Supreme Court of the Philippines,(1973–1978). She was appointed DOJ State Counsel I and II (1978–1985), and promoted to senior state counsel (1985–1987), supervising state counsel, and chief of the Legal Staff (1988–1989). Before her Sandiganbayan appointment, De Castro was State Counsel V and Legal Staff head at the DOJ (1989–1995).
De Castro was the Presiding Justice and Chair of the First Division, Sandiganbayan at the time of her appointment to the High Court.

She held the position of President-elect of the International Association of Women Judges (IAWJ) from 2012 to 2014. She is also the Chairwoman of the 2015 Philippine Bar Examination committee.

On August 25, 2018, President Duterte announced his appointment of Justice De Castro as the new Chief Justice of the Supreme Court, replacing Maria Lourdes Sereno who was removed from office by way of an 8–6 decision by the Supreme Court over a quo warranto petition. She formally assumed the office on August 28.

The trial of Joseph Estrada

De Castro headed the anti-graft court's special division on the perjury and plunder trial of former President Joseph Estrada. Estrada's son, Senator Jinggoy Estrada also faced charges. The trial finished in September 2007. Estrada was acquitted of perjury charges but found guilty of plunder and sentenced to life imprisonment. All the co-defendants, including Senator Jinggoy Estrada, were acquitted of all charges.

Estrada appealed the decision and called the court (and De Castro, as head of it) "a kangaroo court", while President Gloria Macapagal Arroyo said the court's decision must be accepted.

De Castro was appointed to the Supreme Court soon after the end of the highly politicized trial. This led to some accusations of quid pro quo. People claimed that she had convicted former President Estrada in exchange for a seat on the Supreme Court. She vigorously denied those rumors, claiming that she had been a candidate for a seat on the high court before her involvement in the case.

Appointment to the Supreme Court

On October 16, 2007, the Judicial and Bar Council (JBC) announced the final nominees to the Associate Justice Cancio Garcia's vacant Supreme Court of the Philippines Associate Justice post. Teresita De Castro, Justices Edgardo Cruz and Martin Villarama, got 7 out of 8 votes, while Associate Justices Francisco Villaruz and Edilberto G. Sandoval and Labor Secretary Arturo D. Brion got 5 votes each (from the JBC). Under Philippine law, the President has 90 days to choose from among the final nominees.

Senator Jinggoy Estrada (son of Joseph), vowed to block the appointment to the Supreme Court of Sandiganbayan Justices Teresita de Castro and Francisco Villaruz, Jr. (who convicted his father – President Joseph Estrada). Jinggoy argued that: "Such a promotion would seem like a reward in exchange for the guilty verdict against the deposed President. We are convinced, then and now, that the special court created to exclusively try the case of President Estrada was established precisely to convict him, which is what exactly happened."

De Castro was sworn before Chief Justice Reynato S. Puno on December 4, 2007. Teresita de Castro stated: "Everything happens in God's time. I believe that my 34 years of service in the judiciary and a good track record make me qualified for this position."  Immediately after being sworn in, she participated in her first en banc session.

De Castro became controversial when she was the Sandiganbayan's Presiding Justice after her Division convicted former President Joseph Estrada for graft. Many believed that her decision was related to her subsequent appointment by former President Gloria Macapagal Arroyo as the 160th Associate Justice of the Supreme Court in 2007 in exchange of her favorable decision.

Reactions to her appointment to the Supreme Court
 Joseph Estrada called the appointment of Teresita de Castro as a "reward for an unjust conviction [of him]".
 Sen. Francis Pangilinan questioned de Castro's appointment in light of her impending retirement on October 8, saying it "does not help in the strengthening of the rule of law."
 Former Solicitor General Florin Hilbay and opposition lawmaker Gary Alejano said that de Castro's appointment may be considered as the President's way of paying his debt of gratitude to the second most senior magistrate of the high court.
 Minority Leader Aquilino Pimentel, Jr. said: "That is the President's call and I do not question it. Of course, other persons may have personal reasons for objecting to the appointment of Justice De Castro. But you cannot please everyone."
 On December 4, 2007, Senate President Manuel Villar and Senate President Pro-Tempore Jinggoy Estrada (the son of Joseph) questioned the timing of de Castro's appointment. Villar stated that: "The appointment coming so soon after de Castro's Division had convicted former President Joseph Estrada is bad timing. It gives the impression that it was her reward for convicting Erap [Estrada's nickname]."  Jinggoy Estrada said: "A few months after the conviction of President Estrada, she [de Castro] was immediately appointed to the Supreme Court. I think there was a deal between Malacañang and Sandiganbayan that if she convicts Estrada, she would be appointed to the Supreme Court. That gave political color to the decision of Sandiganbayan. I think she is qualified to be an associate justice. It's just that the timing is wrong. If I were Justice de Castro, I would have refused the appointment out of delicadeza [good taste]. It did not look good in the eyes of the public."
 Sen. Richard Gordon stated that "de Castro is highly qualified for the High Tribunal and that her appointment could not be interpreted as "reward" for her decision on the Erap plunder case. Malacañang had ignored the Sandiganbayan's guilty verdict and granted absolute pardon to the former president."
 Executive Secretary Eduardo Ermita defended the appointment of Teresita de Castro noting that she was nominated several times to the post but because she was still handling the Estrada case she was bypassed twice. He added that de Castro deserved the appointment.

Testimony against Sereno
De Castro was one of five sitting justices who sought to nullify the appointment of Maria Lourdes Sereno as the country's top magistrate. De Castro and Sereno were both shortlisted by the Judicial and Bar Council in 2012 for the Chief Justiceship but then-President Benigno Aquino III appointed the latter to the post. Along with four other members, she was accused of exhausting legal remedies to oust the incumbent Chief Justice.

Chief Justice
On August 25, 2018, De Castro was appointed by President Rodrigo Duterte as the Chief Justice of the Supreme Court, following the ouster of Maria Lourdes Sereno via quo warranto. She served 46 days until her mandatory retirement on her 70th birthday on 10 October. De Castro's appointment was criticized due to her expected short term of two months since she is obligated to retire on October 8, 2018, as well as her role as one of the five sitting justices who sought to nullify the appointment of Sereno as Chief Justice.

Education and Qualifications

University and Law School
 AB Political Science: University of the Philippines Diliman (cum laude, 1968)
 Bachelor of Laws: University of the Philippines Diliman (1972)

Training Courses
 Seminar on Loan Negotiation and Renegotiation (August 9 to September 5, 1986), International Law Institute, Washington D.C.
 Program of Instruction for Lawyers (June 11–21, 2004), Harvard Law School, Cambridge, Massachusetts
 Seminar Judging Across Borders: Canadian Judges and International Law, (April 6–9, 2005), National Judicial Institute, Victoria, British Columbia, Canada

Other honors and qualifications
 Phi Kappa Phi International Honor Society;
 Pi Gamma Mu International Honor Society in the Social Sciences;
 Vice Chancellor and consistent Member, Order of the Purple Feather, UP College of Law Honor Society;
 Executive Vice-President, Philippine Women Judges Association;
 UP Sigma Alpha Sorority;
 UP College of Law, Portia Sorority and UP Women Lawyers Circle (WILOCI);
 University and College Scholar at UP Diliman.

Some notable opinions 
 G.R. No. 180643, Romulo L. Neri Vs. Senate Committee, et al. (2008) – on the principle of executive privilege over Congress' right to information
 Criminal Case No. 26558 People Vs. Joseph Ejercito Estrada, et al. (Sandiganbayan 2007) – on the conviction of former Philippine President Joseph Estrada for the crime of plunder punishable by life imprisonment Reclusión perpetua

See also
 Supreme Court of the Philippines
 Trial of Joseph Estrada
 Neri vs. Senate Committee

References

External links
 Justice Teresita J. Leonardo-De Castro (Official Supreme Court Webpage)

|-

|-

|-

1948 births
Living people
Associate Justices of the Supreme Court of the Philippines
20th-century Filipino lawyers
People from Parañaque
Filipino women lawyers
University of the Philippines alumni
Harvard Law School alumni
Chief justices of the Supreme Court of the Philippines
Filipino women judges
Women chief justices
Recipients of the Presidential Medal of Merit (Philippines)
Justices of the Sandiganbayan
21st-century Filipino lawyers
21st-century women judges